The 1983 Western Australian state election was held on 19 February 1983.

Retiring Members

Liberal
Brian Sodeman MLA (Pilbara)
Neil McNeill MLC (Lower West)

National Country
Norm Baxter MLC (Central)

Legislative Assembly
Sitting members are shown in bold text. Successful candidates are highlighted in the relevant colour. Where there is possible confusion, an asterisk (*) is also used.

Legislative Council

Sitting members are shown in bold text. Successful candidates are highlighted in the relevant colour. Where there is possible confusion, an asterisk (*) is also used.

See also
 Members of the Western Australian Legislative Assembly, 1980–1983
 Members of the Western Australian Legislative Assembly, 1983–1986
 Members of the Western Australian Legislative Council, 1980–1983
 Members of the Western Australian Legislative Council, 1983–1986
 1983 Western Australian state election

References
 

Candidates for Western Australian state elections